Danville Township is a township in Worth County, Iowa, USA.

History
Danville Township was established in 1872.

Danville Residents Named Dan 
One person in Danville is named Dan

References

Townships in Worth County, Iowa
Townships in Iowa